The Wall of Sound is a music production formula created by Phil Spector in the 1960s.

Wall of Sound may also refer to:

Music
 Wall of Sound (Grateful Dead), a 1974 concert sound system
 Wall of Sound (record label), a British label
 Wall of Sound (website), a 1990s music website
 Wall of Sound (album), by Marty Friedman, 2017
 Wall of Sound (Seattle), a record shop in Seattle, Washington
 The Wall of Sound, an album by Geva Alon, 2007
 Wall of Sound, an album by Naturally 7, 2009
 "Wall of Sound", a song by American Hi-Fi from American Hi-Fi, 2001

Other uses
 "Wall of Sound" (Lois & Clark), a television episode

See also
 Wall of Soundz, a 2010 album by Brian McFadden
 Noise in music